20th is the seventh live album by the jazz fusion group Casiopea released in 2000. This is a live recording of the 20th anniversary of Casiopea and their thirty-third album overall. This is also their first live album since the release of Made in Melbourne and We Want More in 1992.

Track listing

Personnel
CASIOPEA are
Issei Noro – Guitars, Synthesizer, Voice
Minoru Mukaiya – keyboards
Yoshihiro Naruse – Bass, Bass Synthesizer

Supported
Akira Jimbo – drums

Additional Musicians
Tetsuo Sakurai – Bass
Noriaki Kumagai – drums
Hidehiko Koike – keyboards

Production
Sound Produced – CASIOPEA

Recording & Mixing Engineer – Hiroyuki Shimura, Masatatsu Tsubuki

Release history

References

External links
 

2000 live albums
Casiopea live albums
2000 video albums
Casiopea video albums
NBCUniversal Entertainment Japan live albums
Pioneer Corporation live albums
Live video albums